Kajaran is a village in the Kajaran Municipality of the Syunik Province in Armenia. The village is home to the 17th-century Surp Hakovb Church.

Toponymy 
The village was historically known as Kajarants.

Demographics

Population 
The Statistical Committee of Armenia reported its population was 212 in 2010. down from 223 at the 2001 census.

Gallery

References 

Populated places in Syunik Province

az:Qacaran